Rosa Bonheur (born Marie-Rosalie Bonheur; 16 March 1822 – 25 May 1899) was a French artist known best as a painter of animals (animalière). She also made sculpture in a realist style. Her paintings include Ploughing in the Nivernais, first exhibited at the Paris Salon of 1848, and now in the Musée d'Orsay in Paris, and The Horse Fair (in French: Le marché aux chevaux), which was exhibited at the Salon of 1853 (finished in 1855) and is now in the Metropolitan Museum of Art in New York City. Bonheur was widely considered to be the most famous female painter of the nineteenth century.

It has been claimed that Bonheur was openly lesbian, as she lived with her partner Nathalie Micas for over 40 years until Micas's death, after which she lived  with American painter Anna Elizabeth Klumpke. However others remark that nothing supports this claim.

Early development and artistic training
Bonheur was born on 16 March 1822 in Bordeaux, Gironde, the oldest child in a family of artists. Her mother was Sophie Bonheur (née Marquis), a piano teacher; she died when Rosa was eleven. Her father was Oscar-Raymond Bonheur, a landscape and portrait painter who encouraged his daughter's artistic talents. Though of Jewish origin, the Bonheur family adhered to Saint-Simonianism, a Christian-socialist sect that promoted the education of women alongside men. Bonheur's siblings included the animal painters Auguste Bonheur and Juliette Bonheur, as well as the animal sculptor Isidore Jules Bonheur. Francis Galton used the Bonheurs as an example of the eponymous "Hereditary Genius" in his 1869 essay.

Bonheur moved to Paris in 1828 at the age of six with her mother and siblings, after her father had gone ahead of them to establish a residence and income there. By family accounts, she had been an unruly child and had a difficult time learning to read, though she would sketch for hours at a time with pencil and paper before she learned to talk.  Her mother taught her to read and write by asking her to choose and draw a different animal for each letter of the alphabet. The artist credited her love of drawing animals to these reading lessons with her mother.

At school she was often disruptive, and was expelled numerous times. After a failed apprenticeship with a seamstress at the age of twelve, her father undertook her training as a painter. Her father allowed her to pursue her interest in painting animals by bringing live animals to the family's studio for studying.

Following the traditional art school curriculum of the period, Bonheur began her training by copying images from drawing books and by sketching plaster models. As her training progressed, she made studies of domesticated animals, including horses, sheep, cows, goats, rabbits and other animals in the pastures around the perimeter of Paris, the open fields of Villiers near Levallois-Perret, and the still-wild Bois de Boulogne. At fourteen, she began to copy paintings at the Louvre. Among her favorite painters were Nicolas Poussin and Peter Paul Rubens, though she also copied the paintings of Paulus Potter, Frans Pourbus the Younger, Louis Léopold Robert, Salvatore Rosa and Karel Dujardin.

She studied animal anatomy and osteology in the abattoirs of Paris and dissected animals at the École nationale vétérinaire d'Alfort, the National Veterinary Institute in Paris. There she prepared detailed studies that she later used as references for her paintings and sculptures. During this period, she befriended the father-and-son comparative anatomists and zoologists, Étienne Geoffroy Saint-Hilaire and Isidore Geoffroy Saint-Hilaire.

Early success
 
A French government commission led to Bonheur's first great success, Ploughing in the Nivernais, exhibited in 1849 and now in the Musée d'Orsay in Paris. Her most famous work, the monumental The Horse Fair, was completed in 1855 and measured .<ref>, sketch for the London version; the sketch for the New York version is in the Ludwig Nissen Foundation, see: C. Steckner, in: Bilder aus der Neuen und Alten Welt. Die Sammlung des Diamantenhändlers Ludwig Nissen, 1993, p. 142 and spaeth.net </ref> It depicts the horse market held in Paris, on the tree-lined boulevard de l'Hôpital, near the Pitié-Salpêtrière Hospital, which is visible in the painting's background. There is a reduced version in the National Gallery in London.   This work led to international fame and recognition; that same year she traveled to Scotland and met Queen Victoria, who admired Bonheur's work. In Scotland, she completed sketches for later works including Highland Shepherd, completed in 1859, and The Highland Raid, completed in 1860. These pieces depicted a way of life in the Scottish highlands that had disappeared a century earlier, and they had enormous appeal to Victorian sensibilities.

Bonheur exhibited her work at the Palace of Fine Arts and The Woman's Building at the 1893 World's Columbian Exposition in Chicago, Illinois. In 1889 and 1890 she developed a friendship with American sculptor Cyrus Dallin who was studying in Paris. Together they sketched the animals and cast of Buffalo Bill Cody's Wild West Show.  In 1890 Bonheur painted Cody on horseback. Dallin's work from this period "A Signal of Piece" would also be displayed in Chicago in 1893 and be the first major step in his career.

Though she was more popular in England than in her native France, she was decorated with the French Legion of Honour by the Empress Eugénie in 1865, and was promoted to Officer of the order in 1894. She was the first female artist to be given this award.

Patronage and the market for her work

Bonheur was represented by the art dealer Ernest Gambart (1814–1902). In 1855 he brought Bonheur to the United Kingdom, and he purchased the reproduction rights to her work. Many engravings of Bonheur's work were created from reproductions by Charles George Lewis (1808–1880), one of the finest engravers of the day.

In 1859 her success enabled her to move to the Château de By near Fontainebleau, not far from Paris, where she lived for the rest of her life. The house is now a museum dedicated to her.

Personal life and legacy
Women were often only reluctantly educated as artists in Bonheur's day, and by becoming such a successful artist she helped to open doors to the women artists that followed her.

Bonheur was known for wearing men's clothing; she attributed her choice of trousers to their practicality for working with animals (see Rational dress). 

She lived with her first partner, Nathalie Micas, for over 40 years until Micas' death, and later began a relationship with the American painter Anna Elizabeth Klumpke. At a time when lesbianism was regarded as animalistic and deranged by most French officials, Bonheur's outspokenness about her personal life was groundbreaking.

In a world where gender expression was policed, Bonheur broke boundaries by deciding to wear trousers, shirts and ties, although not in her painted portraits or posed photographs. She did not do this because she wanted to be a man, though she occasionally referred to herself as a grandson or brother when talking about her family; rather, she identified with the power and freedom reserved for men. It also broadcast her sexuality at a time where the lesbian stereotype consisted of women who cut their hair short, wore trousers, and chain-smoked. Rosa Bonheur did all three. Bonheur never explicitly said she was a lesbian, but her lifestyle and the way she talked about her female partners suggests this.

Until 2013 women in France were technically forbidden from wearing trousers by the “Decree concerning the cross-dressing of women” which was implemented on 17 November 1800. By at least World War II this was largely ignored, but in Bonheur's time was still an issue. In 1852, Bonheur had to ask permission from the police to wear trousers, as this was her preferred attire to go to the sheep and cattle markets to study the animals she painted.

Bonheur, while taking pleasure in activities usually reserved for men (such as hunting and smoking), viewed her womanhood as something far superior to anything a man could offer or experience. She viewed men as stupid and mentioned that the only males she had time or attention for were the bulls she painted.

Having chosen to never become an adjunct or appendage to a man in terms of painting, she decided she would be her own boss and that she would lean on herself and her female partners instead. She had her partners focus on the home life while she took on the role of breadwinner by concentrating on her painting. Bonheur's legacy paved the way for other lesbian artists who didn't favour the life society had laid out for them.

Bonheur died on 25 May 1899, at the age of 77, at Thomery (By), France. She was buried together with Nathalie Micas (1824 – 24 June 1889), her lifelong companion, at Père Lachaise Cemetery, Paris. Klumpke was Bonheur's sole heir after her death, and later joined Micas and Bonheur in the same cemetery upon her death. Bonheur, Micas, and Klumpke's collective tombstone reads, "Friendship is divine affection".  Many of her paintings, which had not previously been shown publicly, were sold at auction in Paris in 1900.Galerie Georges Petit. 1er. Tome, Catalogue des tableaux par Rosa Bonheur, May 30-June 2, 1900. 2eme Tome, Aquarelles, dessins, gravures par Rosa Bonheur, June 5-8, 1900. 

Along with other realist painters of the 19th century, for much of the 20th century Bonheur fell from fashion, and in 1978 a critic described Ploughing in the Nivernais as "entirely forgotten and rarely dragged out from oblivion"; however, that same year it was part of a series of paintings sent to China by the French government for an exhibition titled "The French Landscape and Peasant, 1820–1905". Since then her reputation has been somewhat revived.

Art historian Linda Nochlin’s 1971 essay Why Have There Been No Great Women Artists?, considered a pioneering essay for both feminist art history and feminist art theory, contains a section about and titled "Rosa Bonheur."

One of Bonheur's works, Monarchs of the Forest, sold at auction in 2008 for just over $200,000.

On 16 March 2022, Google honoured Bonheur with a Doodle to mark the bicentennial of her birth. The Doodle reached five countries: the United States, Ireland, France, Iceland and India.

Biographical works

The first biography of Bonheur was published during her lifetime: a pamphlet written by Eugène de Mirecourt, Les Contemporains: Rosa Bonheur, which appeared just after her Salon success with The Horse Fair in 1856. Bonheur later corrected and annotated this document.

The second account was written by Anna Klumpke, Bonheur's companion in the last year of her life. Klumpke's biography, published in 1909 as Rosa Bonheur: sa vie, son oeuvre, was translated in 1997 by Gretchen Van Slyke and published as Rosa Bonheur: The Artist's (Auto)biography, so-named because Klumpke had used Bonheur's first-person voice.Reminiscences of Rosa Bonheur, edited by Theodore Stanton (the son of Elizabeth Cady Stanton), was published in London and New York in 1910. It includes numerous correspondences between Bonheur and her family and friends, in which she describes her art-making practices.

The 1905 book Women Painters of the World (assembled and edited by Walter Shaw Sparrow) was subtitled "from the time of Caterina Vigri, 1413–1463, to Rosa Bonheur and the present day".

List of works

 Ploughing in the Nivernais, 1849
 The Horse Fair, 1852–55
 Haymaking in the Auvergne, 1853-55
 The Highland Shepherd, 1859
 A Family of Deer, 1865
 Changing meadows (Changement de pâturages), 1868 Spanish muleteers crossing the Pyrenees (Muletiers espagnols traversent les Pyrénées), 1875 
 Weaning the Calves, 1879
 Relay Hunting, 1887
 Portrait of William F. Cody, 1889
 The Monarch of the herd, 1868

Gallery

See also

 Rosa Bonheur Memorial Park
  (Rosa Bonheur Prize)
 Women artists

References

Resources

 NMWA.org Collection Profile - Bonheur article and artwork at NMWA.

Further reading
 Dore Ashton, Rosa Bonheur: A Life and a Legend. Illustrations and Captions by Denise Browne Harethe. New York: A Studio Book/The Viking Press, 1981 NYT Review
Catherine Hewitt, Art is a Tyrant: The Unconventional Life of Rosa Bonheur. UK Published by Icon Books Ltd in 2020.
 Isabella Zuralski-Yeager, "Tedesco Frères Selling Rosa Bonheur: An Inquiry into Dealers’ Stock Books." The Getty Research Journal, vol. 16, 2022, https://www.journals.uchicago.edu/doi/10.1086/721990.

External links

Joseph J. Rishel, “Barbaro after the Hunt by Marie-Rosalie Bonheur (W1900-1-2),” in The John G. Johnson Collection: A History and Selected Works, a Philadelphia Museum of Art free digital publication.
How France is leveraging a lottery to finance historic preservation, 2020 PBS Newshour report with interior scenes of Bonheur's atelier

Rosa Bonheur - Artcyclopedia search
Rosa Bonheur - Rehs Galleries' biographical information and an image of her painting Couching Lion'', 1872
Rosa Bonheur Plowing in the Nivernais (1849). A video discussion about the painting from smarthistory.khanacademy.org
A life without Compromise — Rosa Bonheur biography, artworks and writings on Trivium Art History
Art and the empire city: New York, 1825-1861, an exhibition catalog from The Metropolitan Museum of Art (fully available online as PDF), which contains material on Bonheur (see index)
"Bonheur, Rosa,--1822-1899." Library of Congress

1822 births
1899 deaths
Artists from Bordeaux
19th-century French painters
French women painters
Lesbian painters
French lesbian artists
French LGBT painters
Female-to-male cross-dressers
French Realist painters
French people of Jewish descent
Burials at Père Lachaise Cemetery
Equine artists
Chevaliers of the Légion d'honneur
Officiers of the Légion d'honneur
Recipients of the Legion of Honour
19th-century French sculptors
19th-century French women artists
Sibling artists
Society of Women Artists members